Grupo Desportivo Tourizense is a Portuguese football club based in Touriz, Tábua Municipality. Founded in 1975, it plays home games at Estádio Visconde do Vinhal, with a 1,200-seat capacity.

History
Founded in 1975, Tourizense steadily progressed from the regional leagues in Coimbra to the third division.

Its highest point was playing against Benfica in the 2005–06 Portuguese Cup (11 January 2006), in a 2–0 home loss.

League cup and history

Honours
AF Coimbra – 1st Division:
2002/03

External links
Zerozero team profile

 
Football clubs in Portugal
Association football clubs established in 1975
1975 establishments in Portugal